is an asteroid and near-Earth object approximately  in diameter. As a member of the Aten group almost all of its orbit is closer to the Sun than Earth is. First imaged at Kitami Observatory on 26 November 1994, it was discovered two nights later by American astronomer Carolyn S. Shoemaker at Palomar Observatory on 28 November 1994. The asteroid then went unobserved from 1994 until it was recovered by Mauna Kea in March 2016. It was removed from the Sentry Risk Table on 2 April 2016.

Description 

 orbits the Sun at a distance of 0.5–1.1 AU once every 8 months (240 days). Its orbit has an eccentricity of 0.40 and an inclination of 7° with respect to the ecliptic.

On 25 November 2046, it will pass  from Earth with an uncertainty of ±4133 km.

While listed on the Sentry Risk Table, virtual clones of the asteroid that fit the uncertainty in the known trajectory showed 116 potential impacts between 2054 and 2109. It had about a cumulative 1 in 9090 chance of impacting the Earth. The formerly poorly known trajectory of this asteroid was further complicated by close approaches to Venus and Mercury. It was recovered by Mauna Kea in March 2016, which extended the observation arc from 34 days to 21 years.

It is estimated that an impact would produce the equivalent of 77 megatons of TNT, roughly 1.5 times that of most powerful nuclear weapon ever detonated (Tsar Bomba).

See also 
 Lost asteroids

References

External links 
 List Of Aten Minor Planets (by designation), Minor Planet Center
 
 
 

Minor planet object articles (unnumbered)
Discoveries by Carolyn S. Shoemaker

2021129
19941128